Goswick railway station served the hamlet of Goswick, Northumberland, England from 1870 to 1964 on the East Coast Main Line.

History 
The station first opened on 6 March 1850 but it wasn't open to passengers. The earliest evidence of passenger use was on 11 May 1858, but only for those attending the Goswick farm sale. It was included in the Newcastle Journal as Windmill Hill on 6 January 1853 but only excursion trains stopped here. Regular passenger service began in November 1870. 

The station's name was changed to Goswick on 1 January 1898. It was situated at a level crossing of an unnamed minor lane 2 miles east from the A1. It was close to the Berwick-upon-Tweed Golf Club. A goods siding was northwest of the down platform. However, a mission room was established which joined the goods siding. This was established at the end of the nineteenth century, and this eventually became Wind Mill Hill Presbyterian Church. The station closed to passengers on 5 May 1941 due to the Second World War but reopened on 7 October 1946, although Sunday services were not restored. An accident occurred on 26 October 1947 near the station when the Flying Scotsman derailed due to the driver failing to stop at the signals and the guard not reading the notice of the diversions at Haymarket TMD. The station house was used as a triage for the injured and the church at the goods sidings was used as a mortuary for the 28 people that were killed. The station closed on 15 September 1958 and completely on 10 August 1964 after the last goods service on 10 April 1964 had stopped.

References 

Disused railway stations in Northumberland
1870 establishments in Scotland
1964 disestablishments in Scotland
Former North Eastern Railway (UK) stations
Railway stations in Great Britain opened in 1870
Railway stations in Great Britain closed in 1941
Railway stations in Great Britain opened in 1946
Railway stations in Great Britain closed in 1958